The 2023 PBA All-Star Weekend was the annual all-star weekend of the Philippine Basketball Association (PBA)'s 2022–23 season. This was the first PBA All-Star weekend since 2019 as the event has not been held since due to the effects of the COVID-19 pandemic. Highlighting the weekend was the All-Star Game between Team Japeth and Team Scottie.

Friday events

Obstacle Challenge
This edition was exclusive for big men (power forwards and centers).

 Notes
Gold represent current champion.

 June Mar Fajardo was unable to participate due to a knee injury.
 Jeepy Faundo was selected as June Mar Fajardo's replacement.

Three-point Shootout 

 Notes

 LA Tenorio was unable to participate after undergoing surgery for a sports hernia.
 Jeremiah Gray was selected as LA Tenorio's replacement.
 Baser Amer was unable to participate for undisclosed reasons.
 RK Ilagan was selected as Baser Amer's replacement.

Slam Dunk Competition 

 Jamie Malonzo was unable to participate due to a shoulder injury.
 Encho Serrano was selected as Jamie Malonzo's replacement. However, Serrano was also unable to participate due to a sprained ankle.

Greats vs. Stalwarts
The Greats vs. Stalwarts format of the Blitz Game returned for the first time since 2016. Both teams were only composed of rookies, sophomores, and junior (third year) players. The game also introduced a four-point line and a three-point dunk.

Draft

Lineups

 Notes

 Calvin Oftana was selected as a replacement to the All-Star Game and was subsequently removed from the Blitz Game.
 Andrei Caracut was selected as Calvin Oftana's replacement.
 Isaac Go was unable to play due to a knee injury.
 Alec Stockton was selected as Isaac Go's replacement. However, Stockton was also unable to play due to a fractured nose.
 Kent Salado was selected as Alec Stockton's replacement.

Game

Sunday events

Shooting Stars
The Shooting Stars returned for the first time since 2019 with a different format. There was one PBA courtside reporter, one government official, one sportswriter and a lucky fan. Team Red led by courtside reporter Apple David won the Shooting Stars.

All-Star Game
The format of the all-star game was patterned after the NBA's version, wherein fans voted up to 24 players and two coaches. The two players with the highest number of votes became the team captains and selected their teammates via draft. The game also introduced a four-point line and a three-point dunk, similar to the earlier Blitz Game.

Rosters
The voting started on January 25 and ended on February 15. The final results were announced on February 17, with Barangay Ginebra San Miguel teammates Japeth Aguilar and Scottie Thompson emerging as the top vote-getters and thus are the two opposing captains during the All-Star Game.

The 25th up to the 28th-ranked vote-getters are named as the all-star reserve. They will replace the top 24 players in case a player misses the game due to injury. They are not officially All-Stars unless they actually play the game.

Draft
The PBA-All Star draft was held on February 20. A coin toss was first used to determine the head coaches for the teams, with Tim Cone going to Team Japeth and Yeng Guiao to Team Scottie. In another coin toss, Team Scottie won the flip and earned the right to draft first.

Lineups
All of the reserve players, except Jeff Chan, eventually played during the game as replacements to injured All-Stars, namely team captain Japeth Aguilar, LA Tenorio, Terrence Romeo, and Mikey Williams. Jeff Chan, despite being in the reserve team, begged off from the game and was replaced by Alex Cabagnot. This was Cabagnot's eighth All-Star appearance. 

June Mar Fajardo was unable to play the game due to injury and was replaced by Raymond Almazan. This was Almazan's third All-Star appearance.

Reserve Gabe Norwood was also unable to play the game due to injury and was replaced by Arwind Santos. This was Santos's twelfth All-Star appearance.

Game 
Prior to the game, Team Japeth won the traditional dance-off.

 PBA All-Star Game Most Valuable Player Award: Paul Lee

Notes

References

Philippine Basketball Association All-Star Weekend
All-Star Weekend
PBA